The 1888 college football season had no clear-cut champion, with the Official NCAA Division I Football Records Book listing Yale as having been selected national champions. October 18 saw the first intercollegiate game in the state of North Carolina when Wake Forest defeated North Carolina 6–4. The first "scientific game" occurred on Thanksgiving of the same year when North Carolina played Duke (then Trinity). Duke won 16 to 0.

Conference and program changes

Statistical leaders
Player scoring most points: Knowlton Ames, Princeton, 243

Conference standings
The following is a potentially incomplete list of conference standings:

Independents

References